This is a list of episodes from the anime series . Strawberry 100% TV series has 13 episodes. Each episode consisted of two short stories. The last pair of stories were not broadcast in the original run; lately this episode has become known as episode 10.5. The first OVA was released before the TV series aired, but chronologically the OVA story is direct continuation of the TV series. The second OVAs are not a continuation of the TV series, but are rather separate episodes based on certain chapters from the Strawberry 100% manga.

TV series
The episode titles are given in story chronological order.

OVAs

References 

Strawberry 100